Jellico is a city in Campbell County, Tennessee, United States, on the state border with Kentucky,  by road north of Knoxville. The population was 2,355 at the 2010 census.

History

The name "Jellico" is a local alteration of "angelica", the name of an herb that grows in abundance in the surrounding mountains.

In the early 1880s, a high quality bituminous coal was discovered in the Jellico Mountains, and with the completion of railroad tracks to the area in 1883, coal mines quickly sprang up throughout the area. The city of Jellico was initially founded as "Smithburg" in 1878 but changed its name to "Jellico" in 1883 to capitalize on the growing popularity of Jellico coal. The city was incorporated on March 7, 1883.

Throughout the 1890s and early 1900s, Jellico was one of the most productive coal fields in Kentucky and Tennessee. In 1906, a  railroad car packed with dynamite exploded in Jellico, killing eight and destroying part of the town. The town quickly recovered, however, and many of the buildings in the Main Street area date from this period.

On July 6, 1944, at High Cliff (3 miles east of Jellico), a troop train carrying new recruits on the Louisville and Nashville Railroad derailed, causing the locomotive and 4 leading cars to fall 50 feet into Clear Fork; 35 people were killed and 100 more injured.

In 1971, Indian Mountain State Park was created at the site of a reclaimed strip mine in western Jellico. In 1999, much of North and South Main Street was placed on the National Register of Historic Places as the Jellico Commercial Historic District.

Geography

Jellico is located along the northern border of Tennessee at  (36.582627, -84.130608). The city is situated amidst the Cumberland Mountains in the valley of Elk Creek, which flows north into Kentucky. Jellico spans the western bases and slopes of three steep hills that split the Elk Creek valley from the larger Clear Fork valley to the east. This mountain and an adjacent lake are now home to Indian Mountain State Park. The larger Jellico Mountain dominates the area beyond Indian Mountain to the west, and Pine Mountain dominates the area beyond the Clear Fork Valley to the east.

Jellico is concentrated around the junction of U.S. Route 25W (North Main Street and 5th Street), which connects Jellico to Interstate 75 to the southeast and Corbin, Kentucky, to the north, and Tennessee State Route 297 (South Main Street), which connects Jellico with Huntsville to the southwest. The Tennessee-Kentucky state line forms Jellico's official northern boundary, although houses and businesses associated with the city are on both sides of the border.

Demographics

2020 census

As of the 2020 United States census, there were 2,154 people, 974 households, and 526 families residing in the city.

2000 census
As of the census of 2000, there were 2,448 people, 1,022 households, and 657 families residing in the city. The population density was 561.7 people per square mile (216.8/km2). There were 1,105 housing units at an average density of 253.5 per square mile (97.9/km2). The racial makeup of the city was 96.24% White, 1.96% African American, 0.16% Native American, 0.65% Asian, and 0.98% from two or more races. Hispanic or Latino of any race were 0.37% of the population.

There were 1,022 households, out of which 26.7% had children under the age of 18 living with them, 44.1% were married couples living together, 16.2% had a female householder with no husband present, and 35.7% were non-families. 32.8% of all households were made up of individuals, and 17.1% had someone living alone who was 65 years of age or older. The average household size was 2.29 and the average family size was 2.90.

In the city, the population was spread out, with 21.0% under the age of 18, 8.7% from 18 to 24, 24.1% from 25 to 44, 25.1% from 45 to 64, and 21.0% who were 65 years of age or older. The median age was 42 years. For every 100 females, there were 82.8 males. For every 100 females age 18 and over, there were 78.3 males.

The median income for a household in the city was $20,303, and the median income for a family was $25,709. Males had a median income of $27,619 versus $16,953 for females. The per capita income for the city was $11,587. About 28.8% of families and 31.9% of the population were below the poverty line, including 45.3% of those under age 18 and 23.2% of those age 65 or over.

Economy
Jellico Community Hospital is the largest employer with approximately 350 employees.

There are several restaurants, hotels/motels and gas stations located off Jellico's exit of Interstate 75, Exit 160.  A Tennessee Welcome Center is located along the interstate just south of the state line.

Religion
Since 1922, Jellico has been the home of the denominational headquarters for the Church of God Mountain Assembly, a holiness Pentecostal Christian denomination.

Notable people
Jellico was the childhood home of Grace Moore, soprano star of opera, musical theatre, and film, and Homer Rodeheaver, hymn-writer, trombonist, and pioneer in the recording of sacred music.

Gallery

References

External links

 
 Municipal Technical Advisory Service entry for Jellico — information on local government, elections, and link to charter
 
 Jellico Photo Album — old and recent photographs of Jellico
 Gem City of the Mountains, essay about Jellico by journalist Edgar Miller

Cities in Tennessee
Cities in Campbell County, Tennessee
Coal towns in Tennessee